The London House Sessions is a compilation album collecting music recorded by the Oscar Peterson Trio at the London House jazz club in Chicago in the summer of 1961. 

Selected tracks from these concerts were previously released on four albums in 1961 and 1962: The Trio, The Sound of the Trio, Put On a Happy Face, and Something Warm. Those albums are included as part of the complete Sessions, along with 23 previously-unreleased tracks (including several versions of frequent set-closer "Billy Boy"). Several additional tracks were subsequently included on the CD reissues of The Trio and The Sound of the Trio.

The London House Sessions was initially released on four LPs. It was also released as a five CD box set in 1996 by Polygram.

Track listing
Disc One

Disc Two

Disc Three

Disc Four

Disc Five

Notes
All tracks recorded between July 27 and August 6, 1961, at the London House, Chicago. 
Tracks 37-41 subsequently included on the 1997 CD reissue of The Trio.
Track 40 ends abruptly (but ends with fade out on the CD reissue of The Trio).  
Tracks 32-36 subsequently included on the 2000 CD reissue of The Sound of The Trio.

Personnel
Performance
 Oscar Peterson – piano
 Ray Brown – double bass
 Ed Thigpen – drums

Production
 Richard Seidel – executive producer
 Michael Lang – supervisor
 Ben Young – researcher, restorer

References

1996 live albums
1996 compilation albums
Oscar Peterson live albums
Oscar Peterson compilation albums
Albums produced by Norman Granz
Albums recorded at The London House, Chicago
Verve Records live albums